HMS Donovan was a  Royal Navy  sloop.

References
 

 

1918 ships
24-class sloops